Acrobasis fallouella is a species of snout moth in the genus Acrobasis. It was described by Ragonot in 1871. It is found in France.

References

Moths described in 1871
Acrobasis
Moths of Europe